The 2021–22 Canberra United FC season is the club's fourteenth season in the A-League Women, the premier competition for women's football originally known as the W-League. The club's manager for the season is Vicki Linton, and the team are playing their home games at Viking Park.

Players

Squad information

Transfers in

Transfers out

W-League

League table

Matches

 All times are in AEDT

Results summary

Results by round

External links 
 Official Website

References 

Canberra United FC seasons